In the Womb is a documentary television special miniseries that was premiered on March 6, 2005, on the National Geographic Channel. Originally beginning as a special about human pregnancy (titled Life Before Birth in the UK), the program features the development of embryos in the uterus of various animal species. The show makes extensive use of computer-generated imagery to recreate the real stages of the process.

Episodes

See also
List of programs broadcast by National Geographic Channel

References

External links

National Geographic (American TV channel) original programming
2005 American television series debuts
2000s American documentary television series